Excuse Me for Living is a 2012 American romantic comedy film written, produced and directed by Ric Klass and starring Tom Pelphrey, Christopher Lloyd, Robert Vaughn, Melissa Archer and Ewa Da Cruz.  It is based on Klass's novel of the same name.

Cast
Tom Pelphrey as Dan
Christopher Lloyd as Lars
Robert Vaughn as Jacob
Melissa Archer as Laura
Ewa Da Cruz as Charlie
James McCaffrey as Barry
Wayne Knight as Albert
Jerry Stiller as Morty
David A. Gregory as Bruce
Tonja Walker as Elaine
Dick Cavett as Reverend Pilatus
Kevin Brown as Officer Franklin
Alysia Joy Powell as Nurse Linda
Maureen Mueller as Harriet
Shenaz Treasury as Bahdra
Tyler Hollinger as Mason

Reception
On review aggregator Rotten Tomatoes, the film holds an approval rating of 14% based on seven reviews, with an average rating of 3.45/10.

References

External links
 
 

American romantic comedy films
Films based on American novels
2010s English-language films
2010s American films